Christian Antonio Díaz Domínguez (born 7 April 1991), known as Christian Díaz, is a Mexican professional footballer who most recently played for USL League One side Forward Madison.

External links
 
 

1991 births
Living people
Footballers from Guadalajara, Jalisco
Mexican footballers
Leones Negros UdeG footballers
Tlaxcala F.C. players
Forward Madison FC players
Liga MX players
Association football defenders
Association football midfielders
USL League One players
Mexican expatriate footballers
Mexican expatriate sportspeople in the United States
Expatriate soccer players in the United States